Letter Kills is an alternative rock band from Southern California, formed in August 2002. They were signed to Island Records.

The band cites their Christian beliefs as the reason they got together.  The name "Letter Kills" comes from Second Corinthians 3:6 - "for the letter kills, but the Spirit gives life."

Their first album, The Bridge, was released July 2, 2004.

They toured the United States with Story of the Year as part of the Nintendo Fusion Tour, in addition to opening for The Used on the Van's Warped Tour in the winter of 2005. Additional bands toured with include Lostprophets, My Chemical Romance, Three Days Grace, and others.

While recording their follow-up to The Bridge, guitarist Dustin Lovelis left the band to form The Fling, and the band soon broke up in 2006. They cited the cause of their breakup as lack of artistic freedom with their label.

After the band broke up, lead singer Matthew Shelton returned to his hometown of Fort Worth, Texas, where he started a new band called Teleo. Lead guitarist Timothy Cordova moved back to Utah and got his master's degree, and shortly after became a middle school Language Arts teacher. Cordova currently plays guitar for The Well Church SLC.

In 2008, Matt Shelton became the permanent lead singer of the band The Wedding, replacing Kevin Keihn. There is currently no word if the band Teleo is actually in works. In July 2009, lead singer Matthew James started to promote his new acoustic solo project, Hotel Spangler, with the album Dead and Done.

2012
In an interview, Matt Shelton stated that there is no possibility of a Letter Kills reunion because the band agreed to split up permanently, but that he wishes luck to his ex-bandmates and their current projects. Shelton was recently recording new material with his band, The Wedding.

2018
According to website chorus.fm Letter Kills started an official instagram account. Their description states "Official Instagram of Letter Kills. Time does march on. [ 2019 ]"

Discography
The Bridge (2004)

References

External links
Burning Stars interview with Paul Remund
Letter Kills Interview With Matt Shelton - REDEFINE magazine, 2004

Christian rock groups from California
Musical groups disestablished in 2006
American post-hardcore musical groups
Christian punk groups
Musical groups established in 2002
2002 establishments in California
Musical groups from Riverside County, California